Felt Cobblestone General Store is a historic general store located at the hamlet of East Victor in Victor in Ontario County, New York. It was constructed about 1835 and is a two-story, three bay cobblestone structure in the late  Federal / early Greek Revival style. It is built of irregularly shaped, multi-colored field cobbles. It is one of approximately 101 cobblestone buildings in Ontario County and one of approximately 20 commercial cobblestone structures in New York State. The store was known to be one of only 5 stores in New York State licensed to sell coca wine.

It was listed on the National Register of Historic Places in 1992.

References

Commercial buildings on the National Register of Historic Places in New York (state)
Cobblestone architecture
Greek Revival architecture in New York (state)
Commercial buildings completed in 1835
Buildings and structures in Ontario County, New York
National Register of Historic Places in Ontario County, New York
General stores in the United States